Premiere is a 1937 Austrian musical crime film directed by Géza von Bolváry and starring Zarah Leander, Attila Hörbiger, and Karl Martell. The wealthy backer of a Viennese musical revue is murdered on the first night of the show. It was Leander's first German language role after previously appearing in Swedish films. On the basis of her performance in the film, Leander was signed by the German Major studio UFA after their major rival, Tobis, had decided she had insufficient star appeal. Her next film To New Shores established Leander as the leading star in Germany.

In 1938 the film was remade in Britain with many of the original musical numbers re-used.

Main cast

References

Bibliography

External links

1937 films
1937 musical films
1937 mystery films
Austrian musical films
Austrian crime films
1930s German-language films
Films directed by Géza von Bolváry
Films set in a theatre
Films set in Vienna
Films shot in Vienna
Austrian black-and-white films